An outbuilding, sometimes called an accessory building or a dependency, is a building that is part of a residential or agricultural complex but detached from the main sleeping and eating areas. Outbuildings are generally used for some practical purpose, rather than decoration or purely for leisure (such as a pool house or a tree house). This article is limited to buildings that would typically serve one property, separate from community-scale structures such as gristmills, water towers, fire towers, or parish granaries. Outbuildings are typically detached from the main structure, so places like wine cellars, root cellars and cheese caves may or may not be termed outbuildings depending on their placement. A buttery, on the other hand, is never an outbuilding because by definition is it is integrated into the main structure.

Separating these work spaces from the main home "removed heat, obnoxious odors, and offending vermin" and decreased the risk of house fires and food-borne illnesses. The study of historical outbuildings also offers information about the lives of workers otherwise excluded from the history of a place, since one possible purpose of an outbuilding was to reinforce class boundaries.

Outbuildings are typically constructed in a vernacular architectural style. Outbuildings can be valuable resources for architectural historians as they may "offer insight unavailable in traditional documentary sources." Architectural historian William Tishler argues that in addition to documenting outbuildings, researchers need to inspect attics and basements "because it's there that you see how things are put together."

Researchers studying detached kitchens in Wiltshire identified some common characteristics of the outbuildings: non-standard floor plans, no large windows, location near the main house, footprint smaller than main house, and little or no interior ornamentation.

Types 

 Bunkhouses
 Slave quarters
 Tenant housing
 Itinerant labor housing
 Bothies
 Wash houses
 Saunas
 Lavoirs (laundries)
 Wood sheds
 Radio shacks 
 Barns, possibly incorporating haylofts and/or outdoor animal pens
 Stables for horses
 Mangers
 Hay barracks
 Outhouses or privies
 Spring houses
 Ice houses
 Pump houses or windpumps
 Tankhouses
 Summer kitchens, detached kitchens, cookhouses, dirty kitchens, etc.
 Bake ovens
 Smokehouses
 Root cellars
 Cold storage
 Wine cellars and wine caves
 Cheese caves
 Butcher houses (after an outdoor slaughter, preparing the cuts of meat for long-term storage would take place in a butcher house)
 Poultry houses
 Pigpens or piggeries
 Milkhouses or dairy barns
 Shearing sheds
 Dovecotes, columbaria, pigeonniers
 Dog houses, kennels
 Siloes
 Granaries grain bins
 Corn cribs
 Rice barns, winnowing barns 
 Hemp-processing houses
 Threshing barns
 Potato houses
 Greenhouses
 Illicit grow houses (marijuana, psilocybin mushrooms, et al.)
 Detached conservatories, orangeries, walipinis, and pineapple pits
 Coach houses
 Machine houses and tool sheds
 Packhouses
 Drying sheds, dry houses
 Kilns
 Forges or smithies
 Sugar shacks
 Oast houses, malt houses
 Cider houses
 Still sheds
 Tobacco barns
 Guard houses
 Guest houses
 Workshops
 Detached garages
 Scale sheds
 Roadside stands

See also 
 Well
 Cistern
 Croft
 Connected farm
 Barnyard
 Shed
 Hut
 Lean-to
 Pergola
 :Category:Pastoral shelters
 Chashitsu (Japanese tea houses)
 Grillkota (Scandinavian grillhouses)

Derivative extravagance
 Folly
 Garden hermit

References

Further reading
 

Buildings and structures
Vernacular architecture